Hidden War is a 2000 made-for-TV movie which was a drama that starred Yasmine Bleeth and James Russo.

Cast

Yasmine Bleeth as Alexia Forman
James Russo as Matt Forman
Christine Gerrard as Rita
David Brosius as Casey Forman
Ryan Brosius as Casey Forman

External links

2000 television films
2000 films
2000 drama films
American drama television films